Ariel Avraham Beit-Halahmy (born February 4, 1966) is an Israeli professional basketball coach who is the current head coach for Hapoel Gilboa Galil of the Israeli Premier League.

Early life
Beit-Halahmy grew up in Givat Shmuel and played for the Elitzur Givat Shmuel basketball youth team.

Coaching career

Early years (1999–2015)
In 1999, Beit-Halahmy started his coaching career with Elitzur Givat Shmuel. In his fourth season with Givat Shmuel, Beit-Halahmy led the team to the Israeli League semifinals, and reached the Israeli State Cup Final, where they eventually lost to  Maccabi Tel Aviv.

In 2003, Beit-Halahmy was named Elitzur Ashkelon head coach. In his second season with Asheklon, he led the team to Israeli League playoffs as the third seed, but they eventually were eliminated by Maccabi Tel Aviv in the semifinals.

On July 12, 2006, Beit-Halahmy was named Ironi Nahariya's new head coach, signing a two-year deal.

On November 5, 2008, Beit-Halahmy was named Bnei Hasharon head coach for the 2008–09 season. That season, he led the team to the Israeli League Quarterfinals, where they eventually lost Maccabi Haifa.

On March 28, 2013, Beit-Halahmy returned to Elitzur Ashkelon for a third stint, signing a two-year deal.

Hapoel Gilboa Galil (2015–2019)
On March 11, 2015, Beit-Halahmy was named the Hapoel Gilboa Galil head coach for the rest of the season. In his second season with Gilboa Galil, Beit-Halahmy helped the team promote back to the Israeli Premier League after they defeated Ironi Kiryat Ata in the National League Finals in five games.

In his fourth season with Gilboa Galil, Beit-Halahmy was named two-time Israeli League Coach of the Month for games played in December and April. He led Gilboa Galil to the Israeli League Playoffs as the sixth seed, where they eventually were eliminated by Hapoel Jerusalem in the quarterfinals.

Hapoel Tel Aviv (2019–2020)
On June 16, 2019, Beit-Halahmy was named the Hapoel Tel Aviv new head coach, signing a two-year deal. On January 18, 2020, Beit-Halahmy parted ways with Hapoel after a 6–10 start to the 2019–20 season.

Hapoel Eilat (2020–2022)
On July 20, 2020, he signed with Hapoel Eilat of the Israeli Basketball Premier League.

Hapoel Gilboa Galil (2023–present)
On January 9, 2023, he signed with Hapoel Gilboa Galil of the Israeli Premier League.

National team coaching career
In July 2018, Beit-Halahmy led the Israel national under-20 basketball team to win their first-ever FIBA Europe Under-20 Championship and earn a gold medal. In July 2019, Beit-Halahmy led the Israel national under-20 basketball team to their second FIBA Europe Under-20 Championship title in Israel, earning a second gold medal for the Israeli team.

References

External links 
 Basket.co.il profile

1966 births
Living people
Israeli basketball coaches
People from Giv'at Shmuel